A roadside attraction is a feature along the side of a road meant to attract tourists. In general, these are places one might stop on the way to somewhere, rather than actually being a destination. They are frequently advertised with billboards. The modern tourist-oriented highway attraction originated as a U.S. and  Canadian phenomenon in the 1940s to 1960s, and subsequently caught on in Australia.

History
When long-distance road travel became practical and popular in the 1920s, entrepreneurs began building restaurants, motels, coffee shops, cafes and more unusual businesses to attract travelers. Many of the buildings were attractions in themselves in the form of novelty architecture, depicting common objects of enormous size, typically relating to the items sold there. Some other types of roadside attractions include monuments and fictionalised-paranormal/illusionary amusements such as the Mystery Spot near Santa Cruz, California, or curiosities such as The Thing? along Interstate 10 in Arizona.

With the construction of the U.S. Interstate Highway System in the mid-1950s, many roadside attractions were bypassed and quickly went out of business. Some remained attractive enough to divert travelers from the interstate for a brief respite and thus remain in business. The best example of this change is along US Route 66, where in the southwest, Interstate 40 provided for non-stop travel. In 2017, the publication Best Life listed 33 top roadside attractions in the U.S. Among those listed were Lucy the Elephant, Margate, NJ; Cabazon Dinosaurs, Cabazon, CA; Oregon Vortex, Gold Hill, OR; Jolly Green Giant, Blue Earth, MN; and Secret Caverns, Howes Cave, NY.

See also 

 Another Roadside Attraction, 1971 novel by Tom Robbins
 Another Roadside Attraction (festival), Canadian music festival 
 Australia's big things, novelty architecture and large sculptures in Australia
 Enchanted Highway, collection of scrap metal sculptures along an unnumbered stretch of highway in North Dakota
 Giants of the Prairies, novelty architecture and large sculptures in Canada
 John Margolies, whose 13,000+ photographs of roadside attractions in the United States are now in the public domain
 List of largest roadside attractions (international)
 Novelty architecture
 Roadside America (disambiguation)
 Tourist trap
 Wall Drug
 What Were They Thinking?, a Canadian comedy television series which profiled roadside attractions

References

Further reading 

</ref>

External links 

 Roadside America: The Decline Of Kitsch? by NPR
 The American Roadside: Photos, news and updates on America's fading roadside attractions
 “Roadside Attractions”, a National Park Service Teaching with Historic Places (TwHP) lesson plan
Society for Commercial Archeology
American highways and roadside attractions (NPR)

 
 Road